The Sporting Clube de Portugal's 2013–14 season main competition is the Primeira Liga, known as the Liga ZON Sagres for sponsorship purposes. This article shows player statistics and all matches  that the club plays during the 2013–14 season.

Competitions

Legend

Primeira Liga

Results by round

Matches

Taça de Portugal

Taça da Liga

Group stage

Squad statistics

Players

Current squad

Transfers

In

Out

Out on loan

References

External links
 Official club website 

2012-13
Portuguese football clubs 2013–14 season